Pectinatites is an extinct cephalopod genus belonging to the order Ammonoidea, that lived during the upper Tithonian stage of the Late Jurassic. They were fast-moving nektonic carnivores.

Clutches of eggs attributed to this genus have been discovered in the Kimmeridge Clay.

References
Notes

Weblinks
 Organism Names
 Echinologia

Ammonites of Europe
Jurassic ammonites
Tithonian life